The 1976 All-Ireland Under-21 Football Championship was the 13th staging of the All-Ireland Under-21 Football Championship since its establishment by the Gaelic Athletic Association in 1964.

Kerry entered the championship as defending champions.

On 12 September 1976, Kerry won the championship following a 0-14 to 1-3 defeat of Kildare in the All-Ireland final. This was their fourth All-Ireland title overall and their second in successive championship seasons.

Results

All-Ireland Under-21 Football Championship

Semi-finals

Final

Statistics

Miscellaneous

 The All-Ireland semi-final between Kildare and Derry is the first championship meeting between the two teams.

References

1976
All-Ireland Under-21 Football Championship